Tsaghkalanj (also Romanized as Tsakhkalandzh; until 1978, Agdzhakala and Aghjaghala) is a village in the Armavir Province of Armenia. The village's church, dedicated to Saint George (Surb Gevorg), dates to the 1870s. It rests on an earlier circular foundation. Nearby, is the whitewashed Amenaprkich Church of an unknown date. There is also a Neolithic-Chalcolithic tell in the village and Bronze Age burial mounds, while the ruins of Amenaprkich, a medieval settlement are nearby.

Gallery

See also 
Armavir Province

References 

 
 World Gazeteer: Armenia – World-Gazetteer.com

External links 

Populated places in Armavir Province